is a singer-songwriter, actor, essayist, and poet born on September 10, 1966, in Minami-ku, Yokohama, Kanagawa Prefecture, Japan. All albums are listed chronologically.

Singles
"Sotsugyō", Canyon, February 21, 1985, 7A0464 (EP), commercial song for "Seishun to Iu Na no Ramen" from Myojo Foods
"Shiroi Honō", Canyon, May 21, 1985, 7A0488 (EP)
"Hatsukoi", Canyon, August 21, 1985, 7A0508 (EP)
"Jōnetsu", Canyon, November 15, 1985, 7A0539 (EP), theme song from the Toho movie Yuki no Danshō
"Kanashimi yo Konnichi wa", Canyon, March 21, 1986, 7A0562 (EP), theme song from Maison Ikkoku
"Doyōbi no Tamanegi", Canyon, May 21, 1986, C12A0491 (EP), remade into the song "Mizutama Jikan" by Hiroko Taniyama
"Aozora no Kakera", Canyon, August 21, 1986, 7A0615 (EP)
"May", Canyon, November 19, 1986, 7A0660 (EP), created as part of a competition with Hiroko Taniyama
"Suna no Shiro", Canyon, April 10, 1987, 7A0708 (EP)
"Sayonara", Canyon, November 18, 1987, 7A0797 (EP), theme from Sayonara no Onnatachi
"Oracion —Inori—", Canyon, June 21, 1988, 7A0867 (EP)
"Christmas Night", Canyon, November 21, 1988, S10A-0220 (EP)
"Yume no Nake e", Canyon, April 21, 1989, 6A1005 (EP), S9A1007 (CD)
"Ave Maria", Canyon, November 21, 1989, PCDA-00033 (CD)
"Itsuka", Canyon, January 15, 1992, PCDA-00268 (CD), PCSA-00178 (CT)
"Naze", Canyon, November 18, 1994, PCDA-00675 (CD)
"Komugi Iro no Tenshi", Canyon, April 21, 1999, CODA-1722 (CD), theme song from movie Komugi Iro no Tenshi
"Kateinai de-to", KAS, June 7, 2006
"Kaze no mukou", Index Music, January 24, 2007, theme song from Les Misérables: Shōjo Cosette
"Kanashimi yo Konnichi wa (21st Century ver.)", Team Entertainment, November 28, 2007
"KIZUNA", 2011, ending theme for NHK anime Heugemono

Studio albums

Axia
Canyon, June 21, 1985. See Axia (album).

Glass no Kodō
Canyon, March 21, 1986, C28A0479 (LP), D32A0168 (CD), 28P6515 (CT)
Sen no Fūne (instrumental)
Tsukinohara
Doyōbi no Tamanegi
Hatsukohi
Jōnetsu
Cosmos Tsūshin
Pajama no Cinderella
Ohikkoshi • Wasuremono
Umi no Ehagaki
Ima dake no Hontō

Chime
Canyon, October 21, 1986. See Chime (Yuki Saito album).

Fūmu
Canyon, April 21, 1987, C28A0562 (LP), D32A0281 (CD), 28P6592 (CT)
One
Taiikukan wa Odoru
Oyashirasu ga Itanda Hi
Side Seat
12-gatsu no Calendar
Kioku
Himawari
Suna no Shiro
May
Nemuri Hime
Machikado no Snap
Kaze • Yume • Tenshi
Kazoku no Shokutaku

Ripple
Canyon, September 21, 1987, D25A0317 (CD)
Sayonara, Sayonara!
Scooter 17
Piihyara
Bōken Kozō
Ushiro no Shōmen Daare
Amanojaku

Pant
Canyon, March 21, 1988, C28A0626 (CD)
Owari no Kehai
Shōjo Jidai
Blue Submarine
Kawaii Atashi
Christmas Night
Morn: Tōmei na Kabe
Furisode ni Peace Sign
3-nenme
Sayonara
Thanks!

To You
Canyon, December 7, 1988, D30A0413 (CD)
Ave Maria
How come: Dōshite Kō na no?
When
What
Why
Where: Kin Iro no Yoru
Who

Age
Canyon, April 21, 1989, D29A1008 (CD)
Lucky Dragon
N'oublie pas Mai (5-gatsu o Wasurenai de)
Glass no Tenkyūgi
Luna
Eien no Tasogare
Doll House
Anata no Sonzai
Ameiro Tokeiten
In My House
Lucky Dragon (Service Version)

Moon
Canyon, July 11, 1990, PCCA-00090 (CD)
Eien (Opening)
Taishō Ikareponchi Musume
Shōjo ga Haru no Engawa de
Kaiten Mokuba
Puraharian: Kodomobeya no Chikyū
Meikyū
Kanegoto
Walkin' Through Your Life
Ma Hi Ru (Shunkan)
Ending: Hello Dolly
Okamoto-san no Maiasa

Love
Canyon, December 4, 1991
Itsuka
Honto no Kimochi
Yours
Asa no Fūkei
Dare no Sei demo nai
Kono Mama
Moon Waltz: 
Letter
Asa no Fūkei (Instrumental)
Julia
Imi

Moi
Canyon, December 7, 1994
The April Fools (Japanese Version)
We'll Sing in the Sunshine
Naze
I Love How You Love Me
Yūgure Nikki
Suki!
If
Kotaeru Koe wa Nakute mo
You Light Up My Life
Anata to Deatte
The April Fools (Original Version)

Nanimokamo kawaru to shite mo
Canyon, February 14, 2011
Yokan
Noraneko
Enshutsu shitai na
Uta
Dream
O-uchi de kakurenbo
Dearest
Ki
Te wo tsunagou
Oriai wa tsukanai
Eien no hito
Que Sera, Sera (whatever will be will be)
O-uchi de kakurenbo (karaoke)

Eternity
Canyon, March 11, 2015
Top Of The World
Tea For Two
Cheek To Cheek
Lovin' You
Blue Moon
Stardust
When I Fall In Love
Across The Universe
Madoakari
Eien

Suikyōkyoku 
Victor, February 21, 2021
Sotsugyō
Shiroi Honō 
Axia ~ Kanashii Kotori ~Hatsukoi
Jōnetsu
Kanashimi yo Konnichi wa
Aozora no Kakera
MAY
Shōjo Jidai
Sayonara

External links
 Encyclopedia Idollica
 Toho Entertainment (official site)
 Idol Pop's 80s (discography)

Discographies of Japanese artists
Pop music discographies
Discography